Gamescom (stylized as gamescom) is a trade fair for video games held annually at the Koelnmesse in Cologne, North Rhine-Westphalia, Germany. Since 2018, it has been organised by game – Verband der deutschen Games-Branche (English: Association of the German video game industry); and before that, by the Bundesverband Interaktive Unterhaltungssoftware (BIU). It supersedes Games Convention, held in Leipzig, Saxony, Germany. Gamescom is used by many video game developers to exhibit upcoming games and game-related hardware.

Alongside Gamescom is Devcom, a portion of the convention dedicated to video game development, though activities of Devcom continue year-round.

Gamescom is the world's largest gaming event (measured by exhibition space and number of visitors), with 370,000 visitors and 1037 exhibitors from 56 countries attending the show in 2018.

Areas
Entertainment area
Indie area
Cosplay village
Retro Gaming
Gamescom Campus
Family and friends
Fanshop area
Business area

Events

2009
Gamescom 2009 was held 19–23 August. 245,000 people attended that year's visit.

Exhibitors

Notable press conferences 
Wednesday, 18 August:
 Electronic Arts
 Sony Computer Entertainment Europe

Thursday, 19 August:
 Microsoft Game Studios
 Konami
 Namco Bandai Games

Notable announcements 
Sony Computer Entertainment Europe announced the PlayStation 3 Slim, a smaller and lighter model of the console and a release date of 1 September 2009. Firmware 3.0 for the PlayStation 3 was also announced, adding new features to the PlayStation Network. Sony announced that the European Video Store would launch in November 2009. Sony also announced that the PlayStation Portable would get smaller games (under 100mb) in the form of 'minis' and that comics would also be available to download in December 2009. A "free game" registration promotion was announced for the PSP Go.

Microsoft Game Studios announced Fable III, along with a release date of 2010. Also, Microsoft announced their intention to release Fable II on the Xbox Live Marketplace in five episodes, the first of which would be free to download.

Media coverage 
While most press conferences were not available for live streaming, Electronic Arts streamed its press conference on EA.com. Sony Computer Entertainment Europe also showcased its press conference on its online community-based service PlayStation Home shortly afterwards. Sony also made its press conference available for download on the PlayStation Store. Various gaming websites offered live-blogging of the respective press conferences.

2010
Gamescom 2010 was held 18–22 August. 254,000 people attended that year's visit.

Exhibitors

Notable announcements 
The two main announcements this Gamescom came from Insomniac Games, who announced two sequels from two of their franchises: Ratchet & Clank: All 4 One, by revealing some gameplay from the game, and Resistance 3, via a live action teaser trailer. These games will be exclusive to the PlayStation 3. All 4 One has a set release date as late 2011, while Resistance 3 did not have a release date.

2011
Gamescom 2011 was held 17–21 August. 275,000 people attended that year's visit.

Exhibitors

Notable events 
 The first Dota 2 International championship took place. The tournament had the biggest prize pool of any e-sports tournament at the time.

2012

Gamescom 2012 was held 15–19 August. 275,000 people attended that year's visit.

Exhibitors

2013
Gamescom 2013 was held 21–25 August. 340,000 people attended that year's visit.

Exhibitors

Notable events 
 The World Championship Series 2013 Season 2 Global Finals, a StarCraft II tournament with a $150,000 prizepool, were held during the event.
  Three League of Legends Tournaments were held during the event:
 International Wildcard Tournament
 Season 4 Spring Promotion Qualifier
 European LCS Playoffs

2014
Gamescom 2014 was held 13–17 August. 335,000 people attended that year's visit.

Notable events 
 The Counter-Strike: Global Offensive Major ESL One Cologne 2014 was held at Gamescom

Exhibitors

2015

Gamescom 2015 was held 5–9 August. 345,000 people attended that year's visit.

Exhibitors

2016
Gamescom 2016 was held 17–21 August. 345,000 people attended that year's visit.

Exhibitors

2017

Gamescom 2017 was held 22–26 August. 355,000 people attended that year's visit.

Notable events 
German Chancellor Angela Merkel opened the event, which marked the first time in history that a Gamescom was opened by a sitting Chancellor.

Exhibitors

2018
Gamescom 2018 was held 21–25 August. 370,000 people attended that year's visit.

Notable events 
 Nvidia announced the GeForce RTX 20 Series at the Palladium Cologne on 20 August 2018.

Exhibitors

2019

Gamescom 2019 was held 20–24 August. Geoff Keighley has announced that he will help launch a dedicated video game announcement show prior to Gamescom, called "Gamescom: Opening Night Live". Inspired by the response to The Game Awards presentation that includes several new game announcements, Keighley wanted to do the same for Gamescom. The event was streamed on 19 August at 8:00pm (CEST).

Exhibitors

2020
Gamescom 2020 was scheduled to be held from 25 to 29 August in Cologne. However, Germany announced that following lifting of lockdowns in the wake of the COVID-19 pandemic, that all public events through August 2020 were banned. Gamescom organizers announced they would move some portions of the planned show online. Organizers confirmed plans for the online Opening Night Live to start on 27 August, with each following day through 30 August featuring a schedule of online developer interviews and events and a wrap-up show.

Exhibitors

2021
Gamescom 2021 was held 25–27 August 2021. The event was preceded by Opening Night Live with Geoff Keighley on 25 August. Gamescom 2021 was a hybrid exhibition experience with online and live events.

Exhibitors

2022
Gamescom 2022 was held 24–28 August 2022. The event was both in-person and online. 265,000 people attended that year's visit.

Exhibitors

Game Developers Conference Europe 
From 2009 to 2016, the Game Developers Conference Europe (GDC Europe), a European spinoff of the Game Developers Conference, has been held in conjunction with the Gamescom. The Conference took place at the Cologne Congress Centre East.

See also 
 Electronic Entertainment Expo
 PAX (event)
 Brasil Game Show
 Gamercom
 Game Developers Conference
 Games Convention
 Asia Game Show
 Paris Games Week
 Tokyo Game Show
 IgroMir
 Video gaming in Germany

References

External links

 

2009 establishments in Germany
August events
Annual events in Germany
Events in Cologne
Recurring events established in 2009
Tourist attractions in Cologne
Trade fairs in Germany
Video game conventions
Video game trade shows
Video gaming in Germany